The sixth season of the American television comedy The Office premiered in the United States on NBC on September 17, 2009, and concluded on May 20, 2010. The season consisted of 22 half-hour episodes, and 2 hour-long episodes to comprise the 26 total episodes of material created. The Office is an American adaptation of the British TV series of the same name, and is presented in a mockumentary format, portraying the daily lives of office employees in the Scranton, Pennsylvania branch of the fictitious Dunder Mifflin Paper Company. The season stars Steve Carell, Rainn Wilson, John Krasinski, Jenna Fischer, B. J. Novak, and Ed Helms, with supporting performances from Leslie David Baker, Brian Baumgartner, Creed Bratton, Kate Flannery, Mindy Kaling, Ellie Kemper, Angela Kinsey, Paul Lieberstein, Oscar Nunez, Craig Robinson, and Phyllis Smith.

The season has been cited by several critics as weaker than earlier seasons, despite still receiving generally favorable reviews. The season ranked fifty-second in the season ratings with an average of 7.80 million viewers per episode, marking a steep drop in the ratings from the previous season which had an average of nine million viewers.

The sixth season of The Office aired on Thursdays at 9:00 p.m. (Eastern) in the United States. The season was released on DVD by Universal Studios Home Entertainment in a four-disc box set in the Region 1 area on September 7, 2010. The DVD set contains all 26 episodes, as well as commentaries from creators, writers, actors, and directors on some of the episodes. It also contains deleted scenes from all of the episodes, as well as bloopers.

Production
The sixth season of the show was produced by Reveille Productions and Deedle-Dee Productions, both in association with Universal Media Studios. The show is based upon the British series created by Ricky Gervais and Stephen Merchant, both of whom are executive producers on both the US and UK versions. The Office is produced by Greg Daniels, who is also an executive producer. Daniels would have a limited role in this season, only co-writing an episode and directing another, as he was busy writing his new show, Parks and Recreation which he co-created with Office writer/producer Michael Schur, who left the writing staff of The Office after season four to focus on the new show. Returning writers from the previous season include Mindy Kaling, B. J. Novak, Paul Lieberstein, Lee Eisenberg, Gene Stupnitsky, Brent Forrester, Justin Spitzer, Jennifer Celotta, Aaron Shure, Charlie Grandy, Warren Lieberstein, and Halsted Sullivan. New writers in the sixth season include Daniel Chun, Jason Kessler (who served as script coordinator) and Jonathan Hughes (who previously wrote several of the Office webisodes). Lieberstein served as executive producer and showrunner. Kaling, Novak, Eisenberg, Stupnitsky and Shure were co-executive producers; Celotta and Forrester were consulting producers; Chun was a supervising producer; and Spitzer, Grandy, Warren Lieberstein and Halsted Sullivan were producers.

This season featured 26 episodes directed by 20 directors. Paul Lieberstein, Randall Einhorn and Seth Gordon each directed several episodes during the season. Writers Jennifer Celotta, Lee Eisenberg and Brent Forrester each directed episodes. Cast members B. J. Novak, John Krasinski, Steve Carell, Mindy Kaling and Rainn Wilson all directed episodes as well.

Season overview 
Notable plots that affect the sixth season and beyond include:

 Jim Halpert's promotion to co-manager alongside Michael Scott, but later returns to sales.
 Dwight Schrute's anger and jealousy that he was passed over for the co-manager job and his subsequent attempts to sabotage Jim
 Jim's wedding to Pam Beesly 
 Michael engaging in a romantic relationship with Pam's mother Helene, much to Pam's horror
 Dunder Mifflin navigating through the economic crisis 
 Dunder Mifflin getting bought out by Florida-based printer company Sabre and the arrival of Sabre representatives Jo Bennett and Gabe Lewis
 Warehouse foreman Darryl Philbin earning a promotion to the upstairs office
 Andy Bernard's attempts to court Erin Hannon
 Jim and Pam welcoming their first child, Cecelia "Cece" Halpert  
 Dwight Schrute and Angela Martin contractually agree to have a baby together

Cast

Many characters portrayed by The Office cast are based on the British version of the show. While these characters normally have the same attitude and perceptions as their British counterparts, the roles have been redesigned to better fit the American show. The show is known for its generally large cast size, with many of its actors and actresses known particularly for their improvisational work.

Main
 Steve Carell as Michael Scott, Regional Manager of the Dunder Mifflin Scranton Branch. Loosely based on David Brent, Gervais' character in the British version, Scott is a dim-witted and lonely man, who attempts to win friends as the office comedian, usually making himself look bad in the process. 
 Rainn Wilson as Dwight Schrute, who, based upon Gareth Keenan, is the office's top-performing sales representative. 
 John Krasinski as Jim Halpert, a sales representative who is co-manager for part of this season, and is based on Tim Canterbury. 
 Jenna Fischer as Pam Beesly/Halpert, who is based on Dawn Tinsley, the office's former receptionist who is now part of the sales team. She is shy, but in many cases a cohort with Jim Halpert, whom she marries and has a baby with. 
 B. J. Novak as Ryan Howard, who had previously left Dunder Mifflin to travel to Thailand, only to be subsequently re-hired in the fifth season "Michael Scott Paper Company" story arc. After making enemies with the recently promoted Jim, Ryan is subsequently moved to a closet office. 
 Ed Helms as Andy Bernard, who had appeared regularly since the opening of the third season, is added to the starring cast from the episode "Sabre" onwards.

Starring
 Leslie David Baker as Stanley Hudson, a grumpy salesman.
 Brian Baumgartner as Kevin Malone, a dim-witted accountant, who is based on Keith Bishop.
 Creed Bratton as Creed Bratton, the office's strange quality assurance officer.
 Kate Flannery as Meredith Palmer, the promiscuous supplier relations representative.
 Mindy Kaling as Kelly Kapoor, the pop-culture obsessed customer service representative.
 Ellie Kemper as Erin Hannon, the receptionist and new love interest of Andy.
 Angela Kinsey as Angela Martin, a judgemental accountant.
 Paul Lieberstein as Toby Flenderson, the sad-eyed human resources representative.
 Oscar Nunez as Oscar Martinez, an intelligent accountant, who is also gay.
 Craig Robinson as Darryl Philbin, the warehouse supervisor.
 Phyllis Smith as Phyllis Vance, a motherly saleswoman.

Special guest star
 Kathy Bates as Jo Bennet, the CEO of Sabre Industries.

Recurring
 Andy Buckley as David Wallace, Dunder Mifflin's CFO.
 Linda Purl as Helene Beesly, Pam's mother, who previously appeared in the season two episode "Sexual Harassment", although the role was recast with Purl, who first appeared in "Niagara", and made two more appearances.
 Bobby Ray Shafer as Bob Vance, Phyllis’ husband, who runs Vance Refrigeration.
 Kelen Coleman as Isabel Poreba, Pam's friend who becomes interested in Dwight.
 Sam Daly as Matt, a warehouse worker that Oscar has a crush on.
 Zach Woods as Gabe Lewis, the director of Sabre sales.
 Nelson Franklin as Nick, the IT guy.
 Amy Pietz as Donna, who is cheating on her husband with Michael.
 Hugh Dane as Hank Tate, the building's security guard.

Notable guests
 Max Carver as Eric, an intern.
 Anna Camp as Penny Beesly, Pam's sister.
 Rick Overton as William Beesly, Pam's father.
 David Costabile as Eric Ward, an investment banker.
 David Koechner as Todd Packer, a rude and offensive traveling salesman, and Michael's best friend.
 Christian Slater as himself, hosting a Sabre welcoming video.

Reception
The sixth-season premiere "Gossip" received a 4.0 share in the Nielsen ratings among viewers aged 18 to 49, meaning that 4.0% of viewers aged 18 to 49 watched the episode. The episode was seen by 8.21 million viewers. The show ranked 17th in the seasonal 18–49 demographic ratings with an average of a 4.0 rating in the demographic. The viewership was an 18 percent drop compared to the fifth-season premiere, "Weight Loss". The season finale, "Whistleblower" was viewed by 6.60 million viewers with a 3.4 rating/10% share in the 18–49, marking a 3% drop from the fifth-season finale, "Company Picnic." The season also ranked 52nd in the seasonal total viewership with an average of 7.80 million viewers.

Critical reception
The sixth season received generally favorable reviews, with an overall score of 78/100 on Metacritic. However, some critics identified a decline in quality compared to previous seasons. The season mainly faced criticism for a lack of stakes for the characters. Some critics have also criticized the conclusion to the Jim and Pam romance while others were critical of the lack of growth for Michael. Cindy White of IGN gave the season a 7.5 saying it was "Good" and "We did get some funny moments and some good episodes in Season 6, but as a whole it just doesn't compare to the strength of seasons past." She also went on to criticize the storylines including Jim's stint as co-manager. Will Leitch of New York said "The Office'''s season six was usually funny and always big-hearted, but there was never much at stake". Entertainment Weekly writer Darren Franich called the season the "least cohesive" season of the series.

Honors

The show received numerous nominations. The show was nominated for Favorite TV Comedy at the 36th People's Choice Awards, but lost to The Big Bang Theory. The show was nominated for Screen Actors Guild Award for Outstanding Performance by an Ensemble in a Comedy Series for the fourth time at the 16th Screen Actors Guild Awards, but lost to Glee''. It was also nominated for two awards at Writers Guild of America Awards 2009 for Comedy Series and Episodic Comedy for the episode "Gossip" written by Paul Lieberstein. This season received four Emmy nominations at the 62nd Primetime Emmy Awards—Outstanding Comedy Series, Outstanding Lead Actor in a Comedy Series (Steve Carell), Outstanding Writing for a Comedy Series (Greg Daniels and Mindy Kaling for "Niagara") and Outstanding Sound Mixing for a Comedy or Drama Series (Half-Hour) and Animation.

Episodes

In the following table, "U.S. viewers (million)" refers to the number of Americans who viewed the episode on the night of broadcast. Episodes are listed by the order in which they aired, and may not necessarily correspond to their production codes.

 denotes an hour-long episode (with advertisements; actual runtime around 42 minutes).

References

External links
 
 

 
2009 American television seasons
2010 American television seasons